Lady Daemyeongjuwon of the Gangneung Wang clan was the daughter of Wang-Ye who became the 15th wife of Taejo of Goryeo. Wang-Ye's first clan was "Gim" as the son of Gim Seon-hui (김선희) and the 6th grandson of Gim Ju-won (김주원). After Wang Geon established the new Goryeo dynasty, Ye then given new Surname "Wang" due to his contribution in help Wang Geon under Wang Sun-sik (왕순식)'s command in the war for achieving unification of the Later Three Kingdoms. Wang-Ye's family and descendants wer become the most powerful family in Gangneung from generation to generation.

References

External links
대명주원부인 on Encykorea .

Year of birth unknown
Year of death unknown
Consorts of Taejo of Goryeo
People from Gangneung